A bullring is an arena where bullfighting is performed. Bullrings are often associated with the Iberian Peninsula, but they can also be found through Iberian America and in a few Spanish and Portuguese ex-colonies in Africa. Bullrings are often historic and culturally significant centres that bear many structural similarities to the Roman amphitheatre.

Common structure 
The classic bullring is an enclosed, roughly circular amphitheatre with tiered rows of stands that surround an open central space. The open space forms the arena or ruedo, a field of densely packed crushed rock (albero) that is the stage for the bullfight. Also on the ground level, the central arena is surrounded by a staging area where the bullfighters prepare and take refuge, called the callejón (alley). The callejón is separated from the arena by a wall or other structure, usually made of wood and roughly 140 cm high. The partition wall has doors for the entrance and exit of the bull (puerta de los toriles) and human participants (puerta de cuadrilla), although the form, number, and placement of these doors will vary from one bullring to another. 
In regular places, the wall is pushed outwards leaving splits (burladero, from burlar: to evade, to dodge) that allow the bullfighters to go in the arena and to take refuge but are too narrow for the bull.
Nevertheless, on rare occasions the bull jumps the wall causing havoc in the corridor.
The walls also have a type of stirrup or foothold that aids in crossing over to the central arena, and sometimes stirrups on the arena side as well; these are used mostly by event staff if they need to intervene quickly in the case of an emergency. 
The arena is surrounded by climbing rows of seats.
The seats are priced differently according to the position of the sun during the show, normally in the afternoon.
The hot sol, "sun", is cheaper than the fresher sombra, "shade".

Architectural origins 

Bullrings evolved as specialized sporting arenas hand-in-hand with the sport that demanded them. Many of the ancient Roman amphitheatres had characteristics that can be seen in the bullrings of today (in fact the ring in Nîmes, France, is a Roman artifact, though it is more elliptical than the usual plaza), and the origin of bullfighting is very closely related to certain Roman traditions; in the formative years of the sport on the Iberian Peninsula, those Roman enclosures were not commonly utilised for bullfighting events. Back when bullfighting festivals were conducted principally on horseback, the spectacle was a more public affair that took place in the city's open plaza area. It was only later, when bullfights were conducted principally by men on foot, that the public needed a structure to house them appropriately. Not only did the crowd need special seating to view the spectacle, they also needed a structure to contain the general disorder that reigned at festivals during the heyday of such legendary figures as Costillares, Pedro Romero, and Pepe-Hillo.

In these early days, the circular form was not to be taken for granted. When La Maestranza bullring in Seville was authorized for construction in 1730 specifically to house bullfights, the original plans called for a rectangular arena for the first three years, only later to be changed to a circular form that avoided the cornering of the action and put all viewers at the same approximate distance, the same reason for the elliptical form of amphitheatres. Another circular plaza was begun in Ronda in 1754, and it featured its first bullfights in 1782.

In the change from the 19th to the 20th century, the Neo-Mudéjar style became in vogue for plazas, involving decoration in visible brickwork.

Since the 1990s, new construction technology allows some rings to be covered permanently or temporarily.

Alternative uses
The primary purpose of the ring is bullfighting, but it is usually limited to some festival weeks in the year.
In other times, it may be used as a concert venue as in the Rock en el ruedo tour of Miguel Ríos or the live record Diamonds & Rust in the Bullring, featuring a Joan Baez concert in the Bilbao plaza.

Before the diffusion of modern sports premises, bullrings were used in the Basque Country for traditional sports similar to challenges of resistance running. The public made bets on the number of laps the runner could make. No bulls were involved.

After the battle of Badajoz (1936) of the Spanish Civil War, the Badajoz ring was used as a confinement camp for supporters of the republic and many thousands were executed there by the Nationalist forces who had just occupied the town.

Most indoor bullrings, especially in Mexico and elsewhere in Latin America, in addition to being used for concerts, have also been used for indoor sports such as basketball, ice hockey, boxing and lucha libre.

Bullrings of the world 
The most famous bullrings in the world are Plaza de Toros de Las Ventas in Madrid (Spain), widely regarded as the most prestigious one, La Maestranza in Seville (Spain), Campo Pequeno in Lisbon (Portugal)  and Plaza de Toros México in Mexico City.

Europe

France
The Arena of Nîmes, Nîmes
The arena in Arles
The arena in Alès
The arena in Mont de Marsan
The arena in Bouillargues
The arena in Trebes
The arena in Vauvert
There are also arenas in an important part of small villages of Camargue
Villages round the Camargue, such as Rodilhan in the Gard, who also practise 'mise à mort' - killing the bull.

Spain

Major venues in Spain
Plaza de Toros de Las Ventas, Madrid (1931)
Plaza de Toros de Valencia (1851)
La Maestranza, Seville (1761)
Plaza de Toros de Vista Alegre, Bilbao
Plaza de Toros de Pamplona, Pamplona
Plaza de toros de La Malagueta, Malaga
Plaza de Toros de los Califas, Cordoba
Donostia Arena, San Sebastian
Plaza de Toros de Zaragoza (1990)

Local venues in Spain 
Plaza de Toros, Aranjuez (1760)
Plaza de Toros de Albacete, Albacete (1917)
Plaza de Toros de Alicante, Alicante (1847)
Plaza de toros de El Puerto de Santa María, Cádiz (1880)
Plaza de Toros de Granada (1928)
Plaza de Toros de Jaén (1960)
Plaza de Toros de La Coruña, A Coruña (1991)
Plaza de Toros de La Ribera, Logroño (2001)
Plaza de Toros de La Merced, Huelva (1968)
Plaza de Toros de Murcia (1885)
Plaza de Toros de Vitoria-Gasteiz (1941) 
Plaza de Toros La Glorieta, Salamanca (1893)
Plaza de Toros de El Bibio, Gijón (1888)
Plaza de Toros de Toledo (1865)
Plaza de Toros de Segovia, (1805)

Portugal

Campo Pequeno bullring, Lisbon
Praça Toiros Palha Blanco, Vila Franca de Xira
Coliseu Figueirense, Figueira da Foz
Coliseu de Redondo, Redondo
Póvoa de Varzim Bullfighting Arena, Póvoa de Varzim (near Porto)
Praça de Toiros de Albufeira, Albufeira
Praça de Touros Amadeu Augusto dos Santos, Montijo
Praça de Touros Celestino Graça, Santarém
Praça de Touros da Luz, Mourão (in contemporary architectural style)
Praça de Touros Daniel de Nascimento, Moita
Praça de Touros de Abiúl, Pombal (one of the oldest)
Praça de Touros de Estremoz, Estremoz
Praça de Touros de Monsaraz, Reguengos de Monsaraz (very ancient)
Praça de Touros de Montemor-o-Novo, Montemor-o-Novo
Praça de Touros da Nazaré, Nazaré
Praça de Touros de Salvaterra, Salvaterra de Magos
Praça de Touros de Santa Eulália, Elvas
Praça de Touros de Santo António das Areias, Marvão
Praça de Touros de Sobral de Monte Agraço, Sobral de Monte Agraço
Praça de Touros de Urrós, Mogadouro
Praça de Touros do Cartaxo, Cartaxo
Praça de Touros João Branco Núncio, Alcácer do Sal
Praça de Touros Carlos Relvas, Setúbal

Africa
Plaza de toros de Melilla, Melilla

Algeria
Arènes d’Oran, Oran

Angola
Luanda Bullring, Luanda

Morocco
Plaza de Toros Tangier, Tangier
Laayoune bullring, Laayoune

Mozambique
Praça de Touros Monumental de Lourenço Marques, Maputo

Latin America

Mexico
Coliseo Centenario, Torreón
Plaza de Toros México, Mexico City (Currently the biggest bullring worldwide)
Plaza de Toros Monumental de Aguascalientes, Aguascalientes
Plaza de Toros Monumental de Tijuana, Tijuana
Plaza de Toros Santa María, Santiago de Querétaro
Plaza Monumental de Morelia, Morelia
Plaza Nuevo Progreso, Guadalajara
Plaza El Paseo, San Luis Potosí
Plaza de Toros El Relicario, Puebla
Plaza Santiago J. Vivanco, Matehuala
Plaza de Toros Jorge "El Ranchero" Aguilar, Tlaxcala
Plaza Monumental Zacatecas, Zacatecas
Plaza Monumental Monterrey Lorenzo Garza, Monterrey
Plaza de Toros Cadereyta, Cadereyta Jimenez
Plaza de Toros Alejandra, Durango
Plaza de Toros Provincia Juriquilla, Santiago de Querétaro
Plaza La Luz, León
Plaza San Marcos, Aguascalientes
Plaza Silverio Pérez, Texcoco
Plaza Quintana Roo, Cancún
Plaza El Centenario (The Centennial), Tlaquepaque 
Plaza de Toros Alberto Balderas, Autlán de la Grana
Plaza Revolución, Irapuato
Plaza de Mérida Mérida
Plaza Calafia, Mexicali
Palacio del Arte, Morelia
Plaza de la Concordia, Orizaba
Plaza de Toros La Esperanza, Chihuahua
Plaza de Toros Vicente Segura, Pachuca
Plaza de Toros Rodolfo Gaona, Cañadas de Obregón, Jalisco
Monumental Plaza de Toros El Pinal, Teziutlán
Monumental Plaza de Toros de Don Antonio, Tepic
Plaza de Toros La Sinaloense, Culiacán
Plaza de Toros Alberto Balderas de Moroleón, Moroleón
Plaza de Toros Monumental de Villahermosa, Villahermosa
Plaza de Toros La Taurina, Huamantla
Plaza de Toros Jose Julian Llaguno, Tlatenango

Argentina
Plaza de Toros de Montserrat (1791–1799)
Plaza de Toros del Retiro (1801–1818)

Colombia

Santamaría Bullring, Bogotá
Plaza de Toros La Macarena, Medellín
Plaza de Toros de Manizales, Manizales
Plaza de Toros Cañaveralejo, Cali
Plaza de toros El Bosque, Armenia. 
Plaza de toros La Pradera, Sogamoso.
Plaza de toros de Vistahermosa, Floridablanca (Santander). 
Plaza de toros Monumental Señor de los Milagros, Girón (Santander).
Plaza de toros de Cartagena, Cartagena de Indias. 
Plaza de toros César Rincón, Duitama.
Plaza de toros Pepe Cáceres, Ibagué.
Plaza de toros de San Fermín, Pamplona. 
Plaza de toros de Cúcuta, Cúcuta.
Plaza de toros Agustín Barona , Palmira.
Plaza de toros La Real Maestranza, Guatavita.

Ecuador
Plaza de toros de Quito, Quito.

Peru

Plaza de toros de Acho, Lima. 2nd oldest. 30 January 1766.
Plaza de Toros Sol y Sombra, Lima
Plaza de Toros de la Provincia de Cutervo, Cajamarca
Plaza de Toros "El Vizcaíno", Cajamarca
Plaza de Toros de Trujillo "El Coliseo", Trujillo
Plaza de Toros de El Coliseo, Huancayo
Plaza de Toros de Sicaya, Huancayo
Plaza de Toros de la Unión, Huánuco
Plaza de Toros de Guadalupe, Ica
Plaza de Toros de Puquío, Ayacucho.

Uruguay
Plaza de toros Real de San Carlos, Colonia del Sacramento (until 1912)

Venezuela
Plaza Monumental de Valencia, Valencia, Carabobo. (The 2nd largest bullring in the world)
Maestranza César Girón, Maracay
Plaza de toros Monumental de Maracaibo, Maracaibo
Plaza Monumental de Toros de Pueblo Nuevo, San Cristóbal, Táchira
Plaza Monumental Román Eduardo Sandia, Mérida, Mérida

Bullrings by capacity

References

External links 
Real Maestranza de Caballería de Ronda
Real Maestranza de Caballería de Sevilla
Plaza de Toros, Ronda Spain
Andalucia Spain bullrings
Plaza de Toros Monumental de Barcelona

 
Sports venues by type